25th Anniversary: Live in Amsterdam is a live album by Toto, released in 2003, in the 25th anniversary of the band. And this was also the band's last live album to feature keyboardist/vocalist David Paich and bassist Mike Porcaro; Paich, before his semi-retirement from touring in 2005 until his return to the band in 2010 with Greg Phillinganes taking his place, and Porcaro, before his retirement from touring due to a ALS four years later and his death on March 15, 2015.

Track listing

CD

DVD/Blu-ray
All songs by David Paich, except where noted.

 Medley:
 "Girl Goodbye"
 "Goodbye Elenore"
 "Child's Anthem"
 "I'll Supply the Love"
 "Gift with a Golden Gun" (Bobby Kimball, David Paich)
 "While My Guitar Gently Weeps" (George Harrison)
 "Bodhisattva" (Walter Becker, Donald Fagen)
 "Africa"
 "Keyboard Solo"
 "Dune"
 "Don't Stop Me Now" (Steve Lukather, David Paich)
 Medley: (Toto)
 "Waiting for Your Love"
 "Georgy Porgy"
 "Lion"
 "Hydra"
 "English Eyes"
 "Till the End"
 "I Won't Hold You Back" (Steve Lukather)
 "Rosanna"
 "Afraid of Love" (Steve Lukather, David Paich, Jeff Porcaro)
 "Hold the Line"
 "Next to You"
 "Home of the Brave" (Steve Lukather, David Paich, Jimmy Webb, Joseph Williams)
 "White Sister"

Personnel
Bobby Kimball – lead and backing vocals
Steve Lukather – guitars, keyboards, lead and backing vocals
Mike Porcaro – bass guitar
David Paich – keyboards, lead and backing vocals
Simon Phillips – drums, percussion

Additional musicians
Tony Spinner – guitars, backing vocals
John Jessel – keyboards, backing vocals

References

Toto (band) albums
2003 live albums